Amerila aldabrensis is a moth of the subfamily Arctiinae. It was described by John Fryer in 1912. It is found in the Seychelles.

References

Moths described in 1912
Amerilini
Fauna of Seychelles
Moths of Africa